Brian Naber (born February 7, 1949) is a former American football coach.  He served as the head football coach at Doane College from 1981 to 1983 and at Cameron University from 1984 to 1989, compiling a career college football record of 54–40–2.

Coaching career
Naber was the 30th head football coach at Doane College in Crete, Nebraska and he held that position for three seasons, from 1981 until 1983.  His coaching record at Doane was 16–14.  Naber also took his Cameron team to the NAIA Championship game in 1986 and 1987, winning the national title on December 13, 1987, with a 30–2 thrashing of Carson–Newman at Cameron's home stadium in Lawton, Oklahoma.

Head coaching record

References

1949 births
Living people
Cameron Aggies football coaches
Concordia Bulldogs football players
Doane Tigers football coaches
Fort Hays State Tigers football coaches